Ezer is a community settlement in southern Israel. Located between Ashdod and Ashkelon near the Mediterranean coast, it falls under the jurisdiction of Be'er Tuvia Regional Council.

History
The village was founded in 1966 as a village centre for the surrounding moshavim. In 1990 it expanded and became a community settlement. Ezer houses religious facilities such as a mikvah and a synagogue.

References

Community settlements
Populated places established in 1966
Populated places in Southern District (Israel)
1966 establishments in Israel